Maksymilian is the Polish form of the male given name Maximilian. Notable people with the name include:

Andrzej Maksymilian Fredro (1620–1679), Polish noble, writer
Franciszek Maksymilian Ossoliński (1676–1756), Polish noble, politician, collector and patron of arts
Józef Maksymilian Ossoliński (1748–1829), Polish noble, politician, writer, founder of the Ossoliński Institute
Maksymilian Berezowski (1923–2001), Polish author, journalist, and erudite
Maksymilian Ciężki (1899–1951), head of the German section of the Polish Cipher Bureau (BS–3) in the 1930s
Maksymilian Fajans (1827–1890), Jewish–Polish artist, lithographer and photographer
Maksymilian Gierymski (1846–1874), Polish painter, specializing mainly in watercolours
Maksymilian Jackowski (1815–1905), Polish activist, secretary-general of the Central Economic Society
Maksymilian Kolbe (1894–1941), Polish Conventual Franciscan friar and a saint
Maksymilian Małkowiak (born 1922), Polish field hockey player
Maksymilian Nowicki (1826–1890), Polish zoology professor and pioneer conservationist in Austrian Poland
Tytus Maksymilian Huber (1872–1950), Polish mechanical engineer, educator, and scientist

Polish masculine given names